Ahmed Yasser Abdelwahab (born 18 June 2001) is an Egyptian basketball player for Zamalek.

Early career
Abdelwahab started playing basketball at 6 years old at Zamalek. Because of his father's work, he moved to the United Arab Emirates where he played for the junior teams of Al-Nasr SC and later to Qatar, where he played with Al-Gharafa.

Professional career
Abdelwahab played his first minutes for the Zamalek first team when he was 17. He also joined Zamalek in the 2021 BAL season, where the team won the first-ever BAL championship.

BAL career statistics

|-
|style="text-align:left;background:#afe6ba;"|2021†
|style="text-align:left;"|Zamalek
| 5 || 0 || 8.2 || .417 || .143 || .500 || 1.0 || .6 || .0 || .0 || 2.4
|- class="sortbottom"
| style="text-align:center;" colspan="2"|Career
| 5 || 0 || 8.2 || .417 || .143 || .500 || 1.0 || .6 || .0 || .0 || 2.4

Personal
Abdelwahab his father, Yasser, was a successful basketball player, who also played for Zamalek and won the 1992 FIBA Africa Club Champions Cup with the club.

External links
RealGM profile

References

2001 births
Living people
Egyptian men's basketball players
Small forwards
Zamalek SC basketball players